EIE may refer to:
 Daniel Eie (1889–1961), Norwegian sports official
 Enough Is Enough (organization), an American Internet safety organization
 Enzymatic interesterification
 European Institute of Education, in Malta
 External independent evaluation